Marla Alupoaicei (born 1974) is an American Christian author and speaker. She and her husband, Catalin, have partnered with several ministries, including Buckner Orphan Care International, to support social justice and particularly ministry to orphans in Romania, Mexico and other nations.

Alupoaicei received a B.A. in English and Communications from Purdue University and a Master of Theology degree from Dallas Theological Seminary. She has worked with a number of authors, pastors and ministry leaders, and speaks at schools, churches, and conferences. She also serves as a professional editor and "book doctor" to help prepare others' books for publication.

An author of nonfiction, fiction and poetry, Alupoaicei has won several poetry competitions, including the Dorothy Sargent Rosenberg Poetry Prize in 2006, worth $10,000. Alupoaicei was a winner of the Writer's Digest 76th Annual Writing Competition for Nonrhyming Poetry. Her poem "Constellation" won first prize in the 2009 Writer's Digest Writing Competition.

Background
Alupoaicei and her husband, Catalin, met while on a mission trip in Romania in 1998 and married in 2002. She serves as the Director of Leap of Faith Ministries, a marriage support ministry in Frisco, Texas. They support and encourage intercultural couples by providing one-on-one mentoring. Their marriage story has been featured in several national newspapers and magazines. The couple founded an intercultural marriage ministry called Leap of Faith Ministries to minister to other cross-cultural couples.

For five years, Alupoaicei worked as a writer and editor for Insight for Living, Chuck Swindoll's international Bible-teaching ministry in Plano, Texas. She then worked as a writer and editor for East-West Ministries, a church planting and missions organization in Addison, Texas. Articles written by Alupoaiceihave been published by Kindred Spirit, a publication of Dallas Theological Seminary.

References

Bibliography

Alupoaicei has written, co-authored or edited over 30 books and Bible study guides, many through Insight for Living. Her books include Generation Hex: Understanding the Subtle Dangers of Wicca (Harvest House Publishers, August 2008) (with Dillon Burroughs); and Your Intercultural Marriage: A Guide to a Healthy, Happy Relationship (Moody Publishers, July 2009).

External links
Official Leap of Faith Website

1974 births
Living people
Christian writers
Purdue University alumni
Dallas Theological Seminary alumni
American women poets
Women religious writers
21st-century American women writers
People from Dixon, Illinois
21st-century American poets
Intercultural and interracial relationships